John Macpherson Almond,  (1 August 1871  – 17 September 1939) was an Anglican priest in Canada in the first half of the 20th century.

Biography

Early life 
Born in Shigawake, Quebec, Almond was  educated at Bishop's University, Lennoxville. He was ordained deacon in 1896; and priest in 1897. He was an SPG missionary in Labrador then a curate at Montreal Cathedral.

Military Chaplain 
During the Second Boer War he served as a chaplain with the Royal Canadian Regiment of Infantry. In 1911, he became regimental chaplain for the 6th Duke of Connaught's Royal Canadian Hussars. During the First World War, Almond would become Assistant Director and later Director of the Canadian Chaplain Service with the rank of Honorary Colonel. During his service at the front and with Canadian Military Forces in England, his efforts to improve services and the reputation of Canadian Military Chaplains would allow him to develop a close professional relationship with several senior Canadian commanders, including Lieutenant General Sir Richard Turner and Lieutenant-General Sir Arthur Currie, who appreciated his no-nonsense attitude and his dedication.

Later Life 
After further missionary work at Grand-Mère he became the incumbent at Trinity, Montreal. He was  Archdeacon of Montreal from 1932 until his death in Montreal in 1939.

References

Bishop's University alumni
Canadian Militia officers
6th Duke of Connaught's Royal Canadian Hussars
Canadian military chaplains
Canadian Expeditionary Force officers
Canadian Commanders of the Order of the British Empire
Canadian Companions of the Order of St Michael and St George
19th-century Canadian Anglican priests
20th-century Canadian Anglican priests
Archdeacons of Montreal
People from Gaspésie–Îles-de-la-Madeleine
1939 deaths
1871 births